The Wibault 9 or Wib 9 was a single seat, parasol wing fighter aircraft designed and built in France in the 1920s. It was a re-engined version of the relatively successful Wib 7, but failed to reach production.

Design
The Wib 9 Simoun was a version of the Wib 7 with the latter's  12-cylinder radial Gnome-Rhône 9Ad replaced by a  water-cooled V-12 Hispano-Suiza 12Jb engine. It was designed and built during the competitive trials held in Villacoublay in 1926–1927, after which the lowly placed Wib 7 won a small order of 25 machines. Originally known as the Wib 71, the Hispano powered version was not completed until after these trials were over, by which time it had been redesignated the Wib 9.

Apart from the engine installation and armament, the Wib 9 and Wib 7 were almost identical. They shared the same all-metal structure, mostly Duralumin covered with narrow aluminium strips applied longitudinally. The parasol wing was straight edged and of constant chord, braced to the lower fuselage with a pair of parallel struts on each side which met the wing at about mid-span. There were cabane struts over the fuselage and a trailing edge cut-out in the wing over the pilot's cockpit to enhance his visibility. The two designs shared the same flat sided fuselage and angular empennage, though the fin of the Wib 9 was noticeably broader. They shared similar split axle fixed conventional undercarriages. The dimensions were also the same apart from a  increase in length resulting from the longer V-12 engine. Though the Wib 9 had both wing and fuselage mounted pairs of machine guns whereas the production Wib 7 had just the fuselage pair, a similar four gun arrangement had been trialled on the second prototype of the Wib 7.

The engine installation of the Wib 9 was different from that of the radial engined Wib 7 but close to that used on the Wib 8, another V-12 Hispano powered aircraft. The engine was totally enclosed within a cowling which clearly followed the contours of the two cylinder banks and was cooled by a retractable, half-cylindrical radiator on the fuselage underside at the back of the engine. A two-bladed propeller was fitted, as on all the Wibault parasol fighters.

The Wib 9 was flown for the first time no earlier than mid-1926. Limited flight trials suggested it was a little faster than the Wib 7 but no production contract followed and development was soon ended. Only one was built.

Specifications

References

Parasol-wing aircraft
Wibault 09
Wib 9
Single-engined tractor aircraft